Toamna Muzicală Clujeană (Romanian for Cluj Musical Autumn) is a classical music festival organised since 1965, by the Transylvania Philharmonic in Cluj-Napoca.

External links
 Program of the 42nd edition (2008)

Music festivals in Romania
Music festivals established in 1965
 
Classical music festivals in Romania
Classical music in Romania